HMS London was a two-decker 90-gun second-rate ship of the line of the Royal Navy, launched on 28 September 1840 at Chatham Dockyard.

In 1858 she was converted to screw propulsion, and reduced to 72 guns.

By 1873, she was a hulk, serving as a depot ship in Zanzibar Bay, off the east coast of Africa. In March 1878 she was recommissioned, and involved in the suppression of the slave trade in the area, serving as a central depot for many smaller steam screw boats; she functioned as a repair depot, a hospital and a storage ship. At this time there were Africans from West Africa (Kroomen or Krumen) and East Africa (Seedies or Sidis) serving on board. There were also Zanzibari and Arab interpreters and cooks from Portuguese Goa (India).

 

Captained by Charles J Brownrigg, this vessel and her crew made several patrols aimed at hindering the slave trade and, on 3 December 1881, caught up with a slave dhow captained by Hindi bin Hattam. This dhow had around 100 slaves on board and was transporting them between Pemba and Zanzibar. Captain Brownrigg led a boarding party to release the slaves but bin Hattam's men then attacked the sailors, killing Brownrigg and some of his party before sailing away. Sir Lloyd William Mathews led a force to Wete on Pemba and, after a short battle, took a mortally wounded bin Hattem (Hindi-bin-Khartoum) prisoner before returning to Zanzibar.

A year earlier (1880), another naval officer, Lieutenant Charles Stewart Smith, led patrols which captured seven dhows and 185 slaves. In 1883, three years later, Lieutenant Smith was seconded to the post of Vice-Consul, Zanzibar to Sir John Kirk, the British Consul-General.

In late 1881, while the vessel was at Zanzibar, it suffered damage of a nature such that repairs were urgently required. The type of wood desired to make the repairs was teak, which "could not readily be procured in the open market." The Sultan was, however, known to have a store of the desired timber and so he was requested to assist with supplying it. This he did and the repairs done. However, the Sultan refused to accept any payment for the supplies. In the eyes of the commander of HMS London, it put the British Royal Navy "in an awkward position" because it would be very difficult to make similar requests in the future.

The final entry in the ship's log is dated 22 January 1883. Captain Luxmoore writes "Paid ship off" "Sent ships company to transport  in passage to England".

In 1884 she was sold and broken up.

Notes

References

 Lavery, Brian (2003) The Ship of the Line – Volume 1: The development of the battlefleet 1650-1850. Conway Maritime Press. .
 House of Commons papers by Great Britain. Parliament. (1883), vol. 66, p. 189.

External links
 
 http://www.pdavis.nl/ShowShip.php?id=26
 HMS London Figurehead Video

Ships of the line of the Royal Navy
Victorian-era ships of the line of the United Kingdom
Rodney-class ships of the line
Ships built in Chatham
Crimean War naval ships of the United Kingdom
1840 ships